Aristocracy of Norway refers to modern and medieval aristocracy in Norway. Additionally, there have been economical, political, and military elites thatrelating to the main lines of Norway's historyare generally accepted as nominal predecessors of the aforementioned. Since the 16th century, modern aristocracy is known as nobility.

The very first aristocracy in today's Norway appeared during the Bronze Age (1800 BC500 BC). This bronze aristocracy consisted of several regional elites, whose earliest known existence dates to 1500 BC. Via similar structures in the Iron Age (400 BC793 AD), these entities would reappear as petty kingdoms before and during the Age of Vikings (7931066). Beside a chieftain or petty king, each kingdom had its own aristocracy.

Between 872 and 1050, during the so-called unification process, the first national aristocracy began to develop. Regional monarchs and aristocrats who recognised King Harald I as their high king, would normally receive vassalage titles like Earl. Those who refused were defeated or chose to migrate to Iceland, establishing an aristocratic, clan-ruled state there. The subsequent lendman aristocracy in Norwaypowerful feudal lords and their familiesruled their respective regions with great autonomy. Their status was by no means equal to that of modern nobles; they were nearly half royal. For example, Ingebjørg Finnsdottir of the Arnmødling dynasty was married to King Malcolm III of Scotland. During the civil war era (11301240) the old lendmen were severely weakened, and many disappeared. This aristocracy was ultimately defeated by King Sverre I and the Birchlegs, subsequently being replaced by supporters of Sverre.

Primarily between the 9th and 13th centuries, the aristocracy was not limited to mainland Norway, but appeared in and ruled parts of the British Isles as well as Iceland and the Faroe Islands. Kingdoms, city states, and other types of entities, for example the Kingdom of Dublin, were established or possessed either by Norwegians or by native vassals. Other territories, for example Shetland and the Orkney Islands, were directly absorbed into the kingdom. For example, the Earl of Orkney was a Norwegian nobleman.

The nobilityknown as hird and then as knights and squireswas institutionalised during the formation of the Norwegian state in the 13th century (see List of nobles and magnates within Scandinavia in the 13th century). Originally granted an advisory function as servants of the king, the nobility grew into becoming a great political factor. Their land and their armed forces, and also their legal power as members of the Council of the Realm, made the nobility remarkably independent from the king. At its height, the council had the power to recognise or choose inheritors of or pretenders to the Throne. In 1440, they dethroned King Eric III. The council even chose its own leaders as regents, among others Sigurd Jonsson of Sudreim. This aristocratic power, which also involved the church, lasted until the Reformation, when the king illegally abolished the council in 1536. This would nearly remove all of the nobility's political foundation, leaving them with mainly administrative and ceremonial functions. Subsequent immigration of Danish nobles (who thus became Norwegian nobles) would further marginalise the position of natives. In the 17th century, the old nobility consisted almost entirely of nobles with some Danish descendants.

After 1661, when absolute monarchy was introduced, the old nobility was gradually replaced by a new. This consisted mainly of merchants and officials who had recently been ennobled but also of foreign nobles who were naturalised. Dominant elements in the new nobility were the office nobility (noble status by holding high civilian or military offices) andespecially prominent in the 18th centurythe letter nobility (noble status via letters patent in return for military or artistic achievements or monetary donations). Based on the 1665 Lex Regia, which stated that the king was to be revered and considered the most perfect and supreme person on the Earth by all his subjects, standing above all human laws and having no judge above his person, [...] except God alone, the king had his hands free to develop a new and loyal aristocracy to honour his absolute reign. The nobilities in Denmark and Norway could, likewise, bask in the glory of one of the most monarchial states in Europe. The title of count was introduced in 1671, and in 1709 and 1710, two marquisates (the only ones in Scandinavia) were created. Additionally, hundreds of families were ennobled, i.e., without titles. Demonstrating his omnipotence, the monarch could even revert noble status ab initio, as if ennoblement had never happened, and elevate dead humans to the estate of nobles. A rich aristocratic culture developed during this epoch, for example family names like Gyldenpalm (lit. 'Golden Palm'), Svanenhielm (lit. 'Swan Helm'), and Tordenskiold (lit. 'Thunder Shield'), many of them containing particles like French de and German von. Likewise, excessive creation of coats of arms boosted heraldic culture and praxis, including visual arts.

The 1814 Constitution forbade the creation of new nobility, including countships, baronies, family estates, and fee tails. The 1821 Nobility Law initiated a long-range abolition of the nobility as an official estate, a process in which current bearers were allowed to keep their status and possible titles as well as some privileges for the rest of their lifetime. The last legally noble Norwegians died in the early 20th century. Many Norwegians who had noble status in Norway had it in Denmark, too, where they remained officially noble.

During the 19th century, members of noble families continued to hold political and social power, for example Severin Løvenskiold as Governor-General of Norway and Peder Anker and Mathias Sommerhielm as Prime Minister. Aristocrats were active in Norway's independence movement in 1905, and it has been claimed the union with Sweden was dissolved thanks to a 'genuinely aristocratic wave'. Fritz Wedel Jarlsberg's personal efforts contributed to Norway gaining sovereignty of the arctic archipelago Svalbard in 1920. From 1912 to 1918, Bredo Henrik von Munthe af Morgenstierne was Rector of the University of Oslo. When Norway co-founded and entered NATO, ambassador Wilhelm Morgenstierne represented the kingdom when US President Truman signed the treaty in 1949. Whilst they now acted as individuals rather than a unified estate, these and many other noblemen played a significant public rôle, mainly until the Second World War (19401945).

Today, Norway has approximately 10-15 families who were formerly recognised as noble by Norwegian kings. These include Anker, Aubert, von Benzon, Bretteville, Falsen, Galtung, Huitfeldt, Knagenhjelm, Lowzow, Løvenskiold, Munthe-Kaas, von Munthe af Morgenstierne, de Vibe, Treschow, Werenskiold, and the Counts of Wedel-Jarlsberg. In addition, there are nonnoble families who descend patrilineally from individuals who once had personal (nonhereditary) noble status, for example the Paus family and several families of the void ab initio office nobility. There is even foreign nobility in Norway, mainly Norwegian families originating in other countries and who have or had noble status there.

Primeval aristocracy

Genesis 
The earliest times in today's Norway (c. 10000 BCc. 1800 BC) had a relatively flat social structure, often based on kinship. People were hunters and gatherers who moved over distances in small parties.

However, in the latest part of the Stone Age, some time around 4000 BC, permanent settlements were established in gradually increasing numbers. Before and parallelly with the introduction of agriculture c. 2500 BC, hunter-gatherer societies became larger tribute societies with elements of stratification. Transition to agriculture was both a condition for and triggered the genesis of the very first aristocracy on the Scandinavian Peninsula. The first aristocracy known in archaeology appeared no later than c. 1500 BC.

Comparatively, transition to agriculture happened c. 9000 BC in the Fertile Crescent and c. 4000 BC in the British Isles. The most obvious reason for Scandinavia's relatively late transition is the Weichsel glaciation, i.e. the latest ice age. Norway was almost wholly covered by ice until c. 7000 BC, and most of the ice sheet was not melted until c. 6000 BC.

Bronze Age 

The first known aristocracy in today's Norway existed in the Bronze Age (c. 1800 BCc. 500 BC) and no later than c. 1500 BC. For this reason, it is called a bronze aristocracy. During this age, settlements became more divided into classes as a new dimension appeared: socio-economical differences.

Based on access to and physical control of natural resources, such as furs, walrus teeth, and other goods that were desired by foreigners, a social élite was able to acquire foreign metals. Bronze is essential in this regard. By importing bronze, which they also established a monopoly on, leading persons and their families would not only express their power but even strengthen and increase it. Bronze was also militarily important. It enabled a limited number of possessors to make weapons stronger than those of stone, and unlike the latter, broken bronze weapons could be melted and reshaped. Common people continued to use tools and weapons of stone during the whole age.

Through trade and cultural exchange, the bronze aristocracy was part of the contemporary civilisation in Europe, despite being placed in the geographical outskirts of it. Continental impulses, for example new religious customs and decorative design, arrived relatively early.

Although there was an established aristocracy, the pyramidal social structure is not similar to the feudal system of the much later Medieval Age. Beside other factors, it has been suggested that agricultural production was insufficient to supply an élite that itself did not participate. In general, it is considered as unlikely that the élite possessed total power. Furthermore, power may not only have been based on weapons. Also religious and ancestral factors are important when explaining how certain persons or families managed to maintain authority for generations. For example, impressive burial mounds could consolidate imaginations of a clan's right to an area.

The bronze aristocracy is known primarily through burial mounds, for example a mound (c. 1200 BC) in Jåsund, Western Norway, where an apparently mighty man was buried together with a big bronze sword. Other mounds were filled with bronze weapons and bronze artefacts, for example rings, necklaces, and decorative daggers. The biggest mounds could be up to 8–9 metres in height and 40 metres in diameter. A construction like this required the work of ten men for about four weeks.

The bronze aristocracy faced a challenge when the position of bronze was taken over by iron. Unlike bronze, which remained an aristocratically controlled metal through the whole age, iron was found in rich amounts in the nature, especially in bogs, and was thus owned and used by broader layers of the population.

Early and Late Iron Age 

Archaeological examination of graves of the Early Iron Age (c. 400 BCc. AD 500) has revealed three distinct social strata. Ordinary farmers were cremated and buried in simple, flat graves. (Whilst this sort of burial had existed in the Bronze Age, too, the cremation part was a recently imported custom from Continental Europe—and not imposed on ordinary farmers in particular.) Grand farmers and aristocrats were buried together with grave goods, while chieftains were buried in mounds. Grave goods of this age are dominated by iron artefacts.

In this age, the aristocracy had begun to enslave humans. The use of forced labor in agricultural production made the aristocracy able to spend more resources on military activities, increasing their capacity to control their tax-paying subjects, to defend their territory, and even to expand it. However, thralls were not an aristocratic privilege. In principle, all free men could hold thralls. A thrall was the rightless property of his or her owner. The text Rígsþula identifies three distinct classes and describes extensively how they evolved: chieftains, farmers, and thralls. Religion was used to explain and justify thralldom, but the original motivation was rather economical.

Furthermore, the aristocracy sacrificed humans to be placed in graves of deceased aristocrats. Also this custom was related to religion, i.e. imaginations of life after death. Contemporary sources as well as archaeological remains document this custom. For example, Arab traveller Ahmad ibn Fadlan (fl. 10th century) documented that a female slave was killed for this purpose in a Nordic burial in Russia.

At the beginning of the Late Iron Age (c. 500c. 793; in Norway known as the Merovingian Age), there were several changes in Nordic culture: for example the deterioration of the quality of works of art and syncopation of the spoken language. Burial customs in several regions were drastically simplified: stone coffins (stones placed together as a coffin protecting the body within a grave or a tumulus) were no longer used, and tumuli became smaller or were replaced by flat graves. Also grave goods appear to have been lesser in amount than before.

Some historians have interpreted these changes negatively. Some suggest that they were caused by plague or interregional conflict, while others believe that the smaller number of tumuli reflects the consolidation of aristocratic power, which meant that large and splendid monuments were no longer necessary.

Hird 

The hird was divided into three classes, of which the first had three ranks. The first class was hirdmann with lendmann as the 1st rank, skutilsvein as the 2nd rank, and ordinary hirdmann as the 3rd rank. Below them were the classes gjest and kjertesvein.

Lendmen, having the first rank in the group of hirdmen, had the right to hold 40 armed housecarls, to advise the King, and to receive an annual payment from the King. They normally also held the highest offices in the state. The foundation for their rights was the military duty which their title imposed.

Kjertesveins were young men of good family who served as pages at the court, and gjests constituted a guard and police corps. In addition, there was a fourth group known as housecarls, but it remains uncertain whether they were considered a part of or rather served the hird.

The hird's organisation is described in the King’s Mirror and the Codex of the Hird.

The system of hirdmen—regional and local representatives for the King—was stronger and lasted longer in the tributary lands Shetland, Orkney, Iceland, and the Faroe Islands, and also in Jemtland, originally an independent farmer republic which Norwegian kings used much time and efforts to gain control over.

Knighthood 

During the second half of the 13th century continental European court culture began to gain influence in Norway. In 1277 the King introduced continental titles in the hird: lendmen were called barons, and skutilsveins were called ridder. Both were then styled Herr. In 1308 King Håkon V abolished the lendman/baron institution, and it was probably also during his reign that the aristocracy seems to have been restructured into two classes: ridder and væpner.

It is difficult to determinate exactly how many knights and squires there were in the 14th and the early 15th century. When King Haakon V signed a peace treaty with the Danish king in 1309, it was sealed by 29 Norwegian knights and squires. King Haakon promised that additional 270 knights and squires would give their written recognition. This were perhaps the approximate number of knights and squires at this time.

Black Death 
The Black Death, which came to Norway around 1349, was bad for the nobility. In addition to the loss of their own members, about two thirds of the population were killed by the plague, and the reduction in available manpower for agriculture caused an economic crisis.

The aristocracy was reduced from about 600 families or 3,600 people before 1350 to about 200    families or 1,000 people in 1450.

The value of land was reduced by 50%–75%, and the land rent was reduced by up to 75%, except in relatively populous central districts like Akershus and Båhus, where the reduction was about 40%. The tithe also reduced by 60%–70%.

Both before and after the plague, Norwegian noblemen were unusually dependent on the King compared with noblemen in other countries. Mountainous Norway has never been conducive to large land estates of continental size. As a consequence of the tremendous reduction in land-related income following the plague, it became even more necessary than before to enter royal service.

Militarily, the Black Death was a catastrophe. As lower and local noblemen were killed by the plague, the recruitment of officers and troop leaders was equally reduced. Having lost their economic base (reduced income of taxes etc.) and their economic guarantees from the King, local aristocrats could often not fulfil their military duties.

Fiefs and fortresses 

The system of royally controlled fiefs was established in 1308, replacing the originally more independent lendmen. There were two types of medieval fiefs:

To the first belonged castle fiefs (Norwegian: slottslen) or main fiefs (Norwegian: hovedlen), to which the King appointed lords, and under them petty fiefs (Norwegian: smålen), which had varying connections with their respective castle fief. In the 15th century, there were approximately fifty fiefs in Norway. In the late 16th century and the early 17th century, there were four permanent castle fiefs and approximately thirty small. Thereafter, the number of petty fiefs was reduced in favour of bigger and more stable main fiefs. Lords of castle fief resided in the biggest cities, where the royal farms or the castles were located.

The second type were estate fiefs (Norwegian: godslen), i.e. private, noble estates that constituted independent areas of jurisdiction.

Likewise, nobles were active in the Kingdom's military defence, in which fortresses had a central position. In the early 14th century, the Fortress of Vardøhus in Northern Norway was constructed due to conflicts with the Russian Republic of Novgorod and as protection against robbery raids of the Karelians. The fortresses Bohus and Akershus in Eastern Norway were established approximately at the same time. An earlier fortress was Bergenhus in Western Norway. There would usually be one or more fiefs attached to each fortress. All fortresses were mainly under the command of nobles, who held the military title of høvedsmann.

Time of greatness 

During the 14th century members of the hird continued in various directions. The lower parts of the hird lost importance and disappeared. The upper parts, especially the former lendmen, became the nucleus of the nobility of the High Medieval Age: the Knighthood. They stood close to the King, and as such they received seats in the Council of the Kingdom as well as fiefs, and some had even family connections to the royal house. There was a significant social distance between the Knighthood and ordinary noblemen.

The Council of the Kingdom was the Kingdom's governing institution, consisting of members of the upper secular and the upper clerical aristocracy, including the Archbishop. Originally, in the 13th century, having had an advisory function as the King's council, the Council became remarkably independent from the King during the 15th century. At its height it had the power to choose or to recognise pretenders to the Throne, and it demanded an electoral charter from each new king. Sometimes it even chose its own leaders as regents (Norwegian: drottsete or riksforstander), among others Sigurd Jonsson (Stjerne) to Sudreim and Jon Svaleson (Smør).

In Norway as well as in Denmark and Sweden, it was in this period that the idea and the principle of riksråd constitutionalism had arisen, i.e. that the Council was considered as the real foundation of sovereignty. Although kings were formal heads of state, the Council was powerful. Their power and active rulership, especially as regents, have caused historians characterise this state as de facto a republic of the nobility (Norwegian: adelsrepublikk).

This aristocratic power lasted until the Reformation, when the King in 1536 illegally abolished the Council. The reign of aristocrats was over when Archbishop Olav Engelbrektsson, who was also noble, the Council's president and the Regent of Norway, left the Kingdom in 1537.

Between reformation and absolutism 

Following the abolition of the Norwegian Council of the Kingdom in 1536, which de facto ceased to exist in 1537, the nobility in Norway lost most of its formal political foundation. The Danish Council of the Kingdom took over the governing of Norway. However, the nobility in Norway, now confined to more administrative and ceremonial functions, continued to take part in the country's official life, especially at homages to new kings.

Having defeated the aristocratic and besides Roman Catholic resistance in Norway, the King in Copenhagen sought to secure and consolidate his control in the Kingdom. Strategical actions would further weaken the nobility in Norway.

First of all, the King sent Danish noblemen to Norway in order to administer the country and to fill civilian and military offices. Norwegian noblemen were deliberately under-represented when new high officials were appointed. Whilst this was a part of the King's tactics, also the lack of Norwegian noblemen with qualified education—Norway did not have a university—was a reason for that the King had to send foreigners. The educational sector was considerably better developed in Sleswick and Holsatia, plus in Germany, so only nobles who sent their children to foreign universities could hope to keep or obtain high offices.

Secondly, during the 16th century the system of independent, family-possessed estates as power centra, like Austrått, was ultimately replaced in favour of fiefs to which the King himself appointed lords. A few Norwegian noblemen were given such fiefs, for example Knight Trond Torleivsson Benkestok, Lord to Bergenhus Fortress, but over time these would find themselves possessed almost exclusively by immigrants. Nevertheless, during the 17th century fiefs were transformed into high offices. Also they were considered too risky for the King.

Thirdly, in 1628 the King instituted a national army of soldiers recruited directly from the estate of farmers. At the same time technical development made traditional military methods outdated. As a result, the nobility was defunctionalised in this aspect.

Absolutism 
In 1660, when Denmark's estates were gathered in Copenhagen, King Frederick III declared military state of emergency and closed the capital city, thus preventing the nobility from boycotting the assembly by leaving. The nobility was forced to surrender. In the following days, Denmark was transformed from an elective monarchy into an hereditary. On 17 October, the 1648 håndfestning was returned to the King, and on 18 October, the King was hailed as an hereditary monarch. On 10 January 1661, the Absolute and Hereditary Monarchy Act introduced absolutism. In Denmark, the Council of the Kingdom faced the same destiny as the Norwegian Council had done in 1536: abolition. The noble monarchy had come to an end.

Formally a hereditary kingdom since old ages, Norway was not affected by Denmark's transition to the same. However, also Norway was affected by absolutism. On 7 August 1661 in Christiania, representatives of the Norwegian nobility signed the Sovereignty Act.

Extinction

The native aristocracy was reduced during the last part of the Late Medieval Age, but not as much as previously believed. Several factors may explain this.

It was a common misunderstanding that Noble status was only transmitted through sons, while in reality, Noble status was inherited according to the specifications in each single Patent of Nobility which in a great number of Patents of Nobility included all descendants, through both female and male lineage, thus the lack of men did not lead to Noble families’ extinction, but were in a large number of cases instead carried on through their daughters.

This precaution was put in place as seen in most of the earliest Patents of Nobility issued in Norway by king Eric of Pommerania, and later re-introduced by those kings who wished to ensure their descendants never ran out of out of Nobles to defend them. Since noblemen as warriors were exposed to greater risks than the population in general and therefore died in a young age and often without issue. Thus, by including all descendants through both male and female lines, those of the kings who regularly incorporated the descendants through female lines, had the foresight to ensure the continuous birth of new Nobles to defend their descendants as future kings.

For a brief period (after 1581 and 1582) unequal marriages could lead to the loss of noble status, noble estates, and similar, but only for those families who had received their Patents after 1581 and 1582 as the king specifically refused to reduce any of the rights granted to older noble families by his predecessors. In an application to the King in 1591, the nobility requested that since it ‘[...] often [happens] that noblemen here in Norway marry unfree women, and their children inherit his estate, [...] which is the nobility to reduction and shame [...]’, their children should not inherit noble status or noble estate.

It is also a factor that noble status was not automatically inherited. If a family for generations no longer provided services to the King, they could, due to oblivion, lose their position. An example is the Tordenstjerne family, whose members in the 16th century were squires, but who due to political and military inactivity in the 17th century had to get their noble status confirmed in the 18th century.

It is often claimed that the old nobility ‘died out’ in the Late Medieval Age. This is mostly but not entirely correct. The term ‘extinction’ includes not only families dying out physically, but also disappearance from the written sources of formerly noble families which had lost their political power and importance. This has even obscured the link between the such families before and in the 16th century and their farmer descendants who appear in sources beginning in the late 17th century. In other words, families of the old nobility may in actuality have survived without knowing it or being able to prove it.

The nobility of the 16th century was of a marginal size, thus being socially more exclusive, but also politically more vulnerable. For example, after the Reformation in 1537, the number of nobles was reduced from approximately 800 and to approximately 400, i.e. under 0.2 percent of the population and approximately 1/7 of the size of the Danish nobility. After 1537, only 15 percent of Norwegian land was in noble possession.

Women and women's rights 

There are a few examples of medieval noblewomen who acted with considerable de facto independence. Prominent are Lady Ingegjerd Ottesdotter Rømer of Austrått and Lady Gørvel Fadersdotter (Sparre) of Giske. It is, however, important to know that they acted as so-called 'pseudo men', i.e. in the formal role of a man (usually their deceased husbands, fathers or brothers). Legally, there was no such thing as formal female roles.

In general, noblewomen had larger economical freedom than women of unfree estate. Whilst the Land Law of 1274 and the Town Law of 1276 gave farmer women and burgher women only limited control of their assets, noblewomen could buy and sell as much as they pleased. This estate-based discrimination would last until the Land Law (including the Norwegian Code of 1604, which was mostly a Danish translation) was replaced by the Norwegian Code of 1687, a law that made all non-widowed women legally minor, regardless of their birth. (Some minor restrictions were introduced in 1604, when Norwegian law, granting unmarried women financial independence from their 21st year, was adjusted to match Danish law, which imposed lifelong guardianship on women and their fortune.)

The noble privileges of 1582 decreed that a noblewoman who married a non-noble man should lose all her hereditary land to her nearest co-inheritor, for example her brother. The rule was designed with the intention of keeping noble land in noble hand, which would strengthen the nobility's power base.

Medieval secular aristocracy overseas

Faroe Islands 
The hird in the Faroe Islands is mentioned for the last time in a document of 1479.

Iceland 
In 1262, Gissur Þorvaldsson († 1268) was given the title Earl of Iceland, indicating and imposing that he should rule Iceland on behalf of Norway's king. It is known that approximately 20–30 Icelandic men had the title of knight in the following centuries, among others Eiríkur Sveinbjarnarson in Vatnsfjörður († 1342) and Arnfinnur Þorsteinsson († 1433).

In 1457, King Christian I ennobled Björn Þorleifsson. The same honour had been granted Torfi Arason in 1450. Björn was hirðstjóri (a high royal official) in Iceland and as well the richest man in this part of Norway.

In 1488, King John ennobled Eggert Eggertsson, Lawspeaker of Viken in mainland Norway. His son was Hans Eggertsson (fl. 1522), city administrator of Bergen, and the latter's son was Eggert Hansson, Lawspeaker of Iceland (fl. 1517–1563). This family is known as Norbagge today.

In 1620 at the Althing, Jón Magnússon the Elder, let a letters patent of 1457 be read, originally given to his aforementioned ancestor Björn Þorleifsson. King Christian IV recognised his noble status. It is claimed that Jón was the last Norwegian nobleman in this part of Norway. The era of the nobility in Iceland ended in 1661 with the introduction of absolutism in Norway.

Medieval secular aristocracy – clerical section 

Members of the royal clergy, i.e. the clergy of the King's own chapels, which were subordinate only to the King and largely independent of the Church hierarchy in Norway, belonged to the secular aristocracy by virtue of their offices in the service of the King.

In a royal proclamation of 22 June 1300 King Haakon V granted St Mary's Church, Oslo—the royal chapel—numerous privileges and decreed that "the learned man who is or becomes its dean" (i.e. the provost) ex officio would have the rank of a lendman, whilst priests with prebends (i.e. the canons) would have the rank of a Knight, the vicars and deacons would have the rank of an (ordinary) hirdmann, and other clerics would have the rank of a kjertesvein; the clergy of this church thus received extraordinarily high aristocratic ranks, according to Sverre Bagge.

In 1314 King Haakon decreed that the provost of St Mary's Church would also hold the office of Chancellor and Keeper of the Great Seal ‘for eternity’, and with some interruptions the office of Chancellor was tied to the office of provost of St Mary's Church until some years after the Reformation in 1536. One of the other priests (typically a canon) would serve as Vice-Chancellor according to the royal letter. The main Great Seal was brought to Denmark in 1398, but the Chancellor kept an older version of the seal that was used until the 16th century. The vicars of St Mary's Church probably had a higher position than elsewhere due to their extraordinary aristocratic rank. In 1348 King Haakon VI found it necessary to stress that the canons had higher rank in every aspect and they alone should administer the estate of their church.

St Mary's Church was an important political institution until the Reformation era, as it was the seat of government in Norway, although from the late 14th century effectively subordinate to the central government administration in Copenhagen and increasingly concerned only with matters relating to the legal field. Peter Andreas Munch has described the royal clergy as a counterweight to the (regular) secular aristocracy with a stronger loyalty to the king and a stronger service element than both the (regular) secular and the clerical aristocracy. The cathedral chapter of St Mary's Church ceased to exist as a separate institution when it was merged with the chapter of Oslo Cathedral in 1545, although its clergy retained their prebends.

Most of the royal clergy—especially those who rose to its upper echelons, such as canon and provost—were recruited from the lower nobility and sometimes even from the higher nobility.

In the years following the Reformation, this royal clergy gradually disappeared, as the entire church hierarchy came directly under the King's control. Some remnants of the institution survived for some time; for example the estate of the provost of St Mary's Church (Mariakirkens prostigods) was customarily given as a fief to the Chancellor of Norway until the 17th century.

Hans Olufsson (1500–1570), who was a canon at St Mary's Church before and after the Reformation and who held the prebend of Dillevik that included the income of 43 ecclesiastical properties, is regarded as the probable progenitor of the still extant Paus family.

Medieval clerical aristocracy 

The clergy was one of normally three estates in the Norwegian feudal system. Together with the King and the secular aristocracy, the Archbishop and the clerical aristocracy constituted the power class in the Kingdom. Until the Reformation in 1536 this aristocracy operated and developed in parallel with the secular aristocracy.

It was in the years after the death of King Olaf 'the Holy' in 1030 that Norway was finally Christianised, whereby the Church gradually began to play a political rôle. Already in 1163 the Law of Succession stated that Norwegian kings were no longer sovereign monarchs but vassals holding Norway as a fief from Saint Olaf alias the Eternal King of Norway. This invention gave the Church bigger control of the royal power, not least because the King had to proclaim loyalty to the Pope. King Magnus V (1156–1184) was as such the first of Norway's kings to use the style 'by the Grace of God'. Nevertheless, this law of succession would last only for a century, when a new and for kings more independent law of succession was introduced.

The Church was actively involved in the civil war era (1130–1240), in which they were allies of the established aristocracy and supported throne pretenders who were (alleged) descendants of 'Olaf the Holy'. Ultimately the Church supported Magnus Erlingsson (1156–1184), the son of Earl Erling Ormsson and Princess Kristin Sigurdsdotter.

In 1184, having defeated King Magnus, Sverre Sigurdsson became King of Norway. Subsequently, Sverre demanded that the Archbishop should be subordinate to the King. As a result of this King Sverre was excommunicated. In Denmark exiled Archbishop Eirik, plus the majority of bishops, arranged a resistance movement known as the Baglers. They managed to re-occupy and control parts of Eastern Norway, from where they represented a permanent threat to King Sverre. Upon King Sverre's death in 1202 it became possible to find a compromise between Sverre's supporters, the Birchlegs, and the Archbishop. In 1217 they managed to agree upon a king: King Haakon IV, a paternal grandson of King Sverre.

During the 13th century there were power struggles between the Church and the King. Several disagreements were temporarily solved with the Concordat of Tunsberg of 1277. This concordat granted the clerical aristocracy several rights and privileges or confirmed existing ones, for example the freedom to trade and the freedom from paying lething. The same concordat gave the Archbishop the right to have 100 sveins (armed pages), whilst each bishop could have 40.

Bishops 

There were ten bishops under the Archbishop of Nidaros, namely:

 Bishop of Bergen
 Bishop of Stavanger
 Bishop of Oslo
 Bishop of Hamar
 Bishop of Garðar (Greenland)
 Bishop of Skálholt (Iceland)
 Bishop of Hólar (Iceland)
 Bishop of Kirkjubøur (Faroe Islands)
 Bishop of Kirkwall (Orkney Islands)
 Bishop of Mann and the Isles (Mann and the Isles)

Canons 

Canons were priests who were also attached to one of the dioceses in Norway.

Canons were recruited primarily from the secular aristocracy. Whilst most canons came from the lower nobility, several belonged to the higher nobility by birth. The latter were sons of knights and even of Councillors of the Kingdom. Examples are Jakob Matsson of the Rømer family, Henrik Nilsson of the Gyldenløve family, and Elling Pedersson of the Oxe family.

In the 13th century canons were styled Sira (compare with English Sir).

Priests 
Priests constituted the local level of the clergy.

Originally a style for canons in the 13th century, priests were styled Sira in and after the 14th century. Subsequently, Sira was replaced by Herr. Sira and Herr were used in combination with the given name only, e.g. 'Sira Eirik'.

Setesveins 

Beside the clerical hierarchy, the Archbishop of Nidaros had his own organisation of officers and servants.

Regional representatives of the Archbishop, setesveins (not to be confused with the noble title of skutilsvein) were seated mainly along the coast of Western and Northern Norway as well as in Iceland. A register of 1533 shows that there were at least 69 setesveins at this time. Their function was to administer the land estate of and to collect the taxes belonging to the Archbishop, and they also traded partly themselves and partly on behalf of the Archbishop. In Northern Norway, a typical location of setesveins was a central position with immediate control of the lucrative fisheries.

Some setesveins belonged to the secular aristocracy too, usually by birth.

After the Reformation in 1537, when King Christian III prohibited the Roman Catholic Church and the Archbishop went into exile, the King punished setesveins who had supported the Archbishop. Many of them had their houses robbed as the King and his soldiers raided the coast.

In Northern Norway ex-setesveins and their descendants were known as page nobility.

Modern aristocracy 

The modern aristocracy is known as adel. The parts of the nobility that are regarded as new in Norway consisted of immigrated persons and families of the old nobility of Denmark, of recently ennobled persons and families in Norway as well as in Denmark, and of persons and families whose (claimed) noble status was confirmed or—for foreigners—naturalised by the King.

An absolute monarch since 1660, the King could ennoble and for that sake remove the noble status of anyone he wished and—unlike earlier—without approval from the Council of the Kingdom. He could even elevate dead humans to the estate of nobles. For example, four days after his death in 1781, Hans Eilersen Hagerup was ennobled under the name de Gyldenpalm. This made as well his legitimate children and other patrilineal descendants noble.

In particular there were two ways of receiving noble status: via an office (informally known as office nobility) and via a letters patent (informally known as letter nobility).

On 25 May 1671 King Christian V created 31 counts and barons. As such two classes were created in addition to the class of nobles: the class of barons (Norwegian: friherrestand) and the class of counts (Norwegian: grevestand). A noble was per definition untitled, and barons and counts did not belong to the class of nobles, but to their respective classes. However, all three constituted the estate of nobles. Barons and counts could be either titular or feudal. The latter constituted the feudal nobility. On 22 April 1709 King Frederick IV introduced the title of marquis.

The introduction of the titles of count and baron was controversial in the old nobility, who were old enemies of royal absolutism and whom the titles sought to outrank. One reaction was the anonymously published theatre play Comedy of the Count and the Baron, written in 1675.

Office nobility

A minor but nevertheless considerable element of the modern aristocracy was the office nobility (Norwegian: embetsadel or embedsadel, also called rangadel). It was introduced in 1679 and would, with extensive reductions during the 18th century, last until 1814.

A person holding a high-ranking office within one of the highest classes of rank automatically received ennoblement for himself, for his wife, and for his legitimate children, and for decades this status was normally hereditable for his patrilineal and legitimate descendants. However, basically all such ennoblements were annulled when King Christian VI, tired of his father's generosity, acceded to the throne in 1730, and only those who received a special recognition after making an application retained their noble status. The office nobility as such was not abolished. Subsequent royal decrees introduced a more restrictive policy, under which noble status dependent on offices was limited to the person concerned, to his wife, and to his legitimate children.
The Decree on the Order of Precedence of 1671 was radical, for the first time deciding that the nobility did not automatically have the highest rank in the Kingdom. It stated explicitly that the nobility should enjoy their traditional rank above other estates and subjects unless the latter were specified in the order of precedence. In other words, any person within the rank stood above noble persons outside this. The Noble Privileges of 1661 had stated the opposite, namely that the nobility should enjoy rank and honour above all others.

Finally, the Letter of Privileges of 11 February 1679 introduced automatical noble status for the highest members of the order of precedence. As such the office nobility had been established. The letter stated explicitly that these persons of rank as well as wife and children should enjoy all privileges and benefits that others of the nobility had in the present and in the future, and it was also stressed that they should be honoured, respected, and regarded equally with nobles of birth.

The office nobility has later been considered with lesser regard, and for example the Yearbook of the Danish Nobility does not include such persons and families.

Examples:

 Mathias de Tonsberg, who was automatically ennobled in 1704 when he became Councillor of the State.
 Hans Eilersen Hagerup, who was automatically ennobled in 1761 when he became General Commissioner of War. (In 1781 he was even ennobled by letter.)

Letter nobility

Beginning already in the High Medieval Age but especially associated with the late 17th century and the 18th century, it became customary to ennoble persons by letters patent for significant military or artistic achievements, and there were also persons who were ennobled in this way after making monetary donations. These are informally known as letter nobility.

Other families are Rosenvinge and Tordenstjerne, both ennobled in 1505. However, the custom of ennobling by letters patent increased drastically in the late 17th century and the 18th century, when numerous persons and families received such noble status. They were a part of the King's plan of creating a new and loyal nobility replacing the old, who until 1660 had been political enemies of the King. However, letters patent given (unofficially: sold) among others to rich merchants were also a lucrative source of income for the Kings, whose many wars at times lead to a big need for money.

Examples:

 Kurt Sørensen was for bravery in battle ennobled under the name Adeler.
 Ludvig Holberg, a famous writer, was ennobled as a baron for his merits and by bequeathing his fortune to the Sorø Academy.
 Joachim Geelmuyden, the son of a priest and the grandson of a tradesman, held many titles and offices in the Dano-Norwegian state and was subsequently ennobled under the name Gyldenkrantz.

Feudal nobility

With feudal barons and feudal counts one saw the introduction of a neo-feudal structure in Norway. These modern fiefs were ruled with conditioned independence by noble families, and they were hereditable. Feudal lords were equipped with extensive rights and duties. On the other hand, a fief was formally a dominium directum of the King. It would as such return to the Crown when a title became extinct (see for example Barony of Rosendal) or when a feudal lord was sentenced for disloyalty (see for example Countship of Griffenfeld).

The main architect behind the new system of barons and counts, introduced in 1671, was Peder Schumacher, who himself was ennobled as Peder Schumacher Griffenfeld in 1671 and created Count of Griffenfeld in 1673. In 1675 the citizens of Tønsberg lost their independence, and the city was merged into the Countship. Griffenfeld had been granted the sole right to all mining and hunting within the Countship. He could appoint judges, arrest and charge inhabitants, and punish sentenced criminals. He could appoint priests to all churches, which he owned. Several duties were imposed on the Count's subjects. For example, cotters under the Count had to work for him without payment.

Whilst these new politics could bring fundamental changes to each area concerned, the effect and the consequences remained limited in Norway in general, as originally only two countships and one barony were created. These included only a small amount of the Norwegian population. Divided into counties, the rest of Norway was under direct royal administration.

Huguenot immigration 
Lutheran Evangelical kingdoms, Denmark and Norway welcomed Huguenots who had escaped from France following the 1685 revocation of the Edict of Nantes. Huguenots were greeted with several privileges, and some even achieved noble status and/or titles. One was Jean Henri Huguetan (1665–1749) from Lyon, who was created Count of Gyldensteen in 1717.

Increasing influence of Norwegians 
During the 18th century, Norwegian-born noblemen and burghers rose to prominence within the Dano-Norwegian state.

Introduction of the stavnsbånd 

In 1733 King Christian VI introduced the system of stavnsbånd—a serfdom-like institution—in Denmark. This was introduced following an agricultural crisis that lead people to leave the countryside and move into towns. The system would last until after 1788.

The stavnsbånd was not introduced in Norway, where all men had been free since the Old Norse heathen trelldom was fought and abolished by the Roman Catholic Church.

Years of Struensee 

During the de facto reign of Johann Friedrich Struensee between 1770 and 1772 the power of the nobility in Denmark and Norway was challenged. Whilst he did not mind creating himself and his friend Brandt feudal counts, Struensee was an enemy of the hereditary aristocracy, which he sought to replace with a merit-based system of government. A part of his reforms Struensee abolished noble privileges and decided that state employments should be based on a person's qualifications only.

In a counter-coup on 17 January 1772 Ove Høegh-Guldberg, Hans Henrik von Eickstedt, Georg Ludwig von Köller-Banner and others had Struensee arrested. In a following trial he was sentenced to death. On 28 April ex-counts Brandt and Struensee were executed; first their right hands were cut off, whereafter they were beheaded and had their bodies drawn and quartered.

1814 Constitution and 1821 Nobility Law

The Constitution of the Kingdom of Norway of 1814, which had been established in the spirit of the principles of the French Revolution and greatly influenced by the Constitution of the United States of America, forbade the creation of new nobility, including countships, baronies, family estates, and fee tails. Beside being in accordance with the contemporary political ideology, the prohibition effectively removed the possibility for Norway's king, who after 1814 also was Sweden's king, to create a nobility of Swedes and loyal Norwegians.

The Nobility Law of 1821 (Norwegian: Adelsloven) initiated a long-range abolition of all noble titles and privileges, while the current nobility were allowed to keep their noble status, possible titles and in some cases also privileges for the rest of their lifetime. Under the Nobility Law, nobles who for themselves and their children wished to present a claim to nobility before the Norwegian parliament were required to provide documentation confirming their noble status. Representatives of eighteen noble families submitted their claims to the Parliament.

In 1815 and in 1818, the Parliament had passed the same law, and it was both times vetoed by the King. The King did not possess a third veto, so he had to approve the law in 1821. Shortly afterwards, the King suggested the creation of a new nobility, but the attempt was rejected by the Parliament.

Many of the Norwegians who had noble status in Norway had noble status also in Denmark and thus remained noble. This and the fact that many Norwegian nobles did not live in the country may have contributed to reduced resistance to the Nobility Law. However, there was resistance, which found its most significant expression in Severin Løvenskiold, who had fought against  democracy and who had worked to stop the Nobility Law. Being an important politician and a major political ally of the King, Løvenskiold was not without power. Løvenskiold argued against the law that Norway's king, and thus the Kingdom's government, had granted his family eternal noble status, and the letters patent of 1739 uses the expression ‘eternally’. At the same time, the Constitution's § 97 in fact stated: ‘No law must be given retroactive force.’

The last Norwegian count with official recognition was Peder Anker, Count of Wedel-Jarlsberg, who died in 1893. His younger brothers were Herman, Baron of Wedel-Jarlsberg, who died in 1888, and Harald, Baron of Wedel-Jarlsberg, who died in 1897. The cousins Ulriche Antoinette de Schouboe (1813–1901) and Julie Elise de Schouboe (1813–1911), as well as Anne Sophie Dorothea Knagenhjelm (1821–1907), died early in the 20th century as some of Norway's last persons who had had official recognition as noble.

Although the institution of nobility gradually was dissolved, members of noble families continued to play a significant rôle in the political and social life of the country. For example, Stewards and Prime Ministers such as Count Herman Wedel-Jarlsberg (Steward, 1836–1840), Severin Løvenskiold (Steward, 1841–1856, Prime Minister, 1828–1841), Peder Anker (Prime Minister, 1814–1822), Frederik Due (Prime Minister, 1841–1858), Georg Sibbern (Prime Minister, 1858–1871) and Carl Otto Løvenskiold (Prime Minister, 1884) had aristocratic backgrounds.

1905 Independence 
Aristocrats were active also in the dissolution of the union between Norway and Sweden in 1905. Most prominent were diplomat Fritz Wedel Jarlsberg and world-famous polar explorer Fridtjof Wedel-Jarlsberg Nansen. Nansen, who otherwise became Norway's first ambassador to London (1906–08), was pro dissolving the union and, among other acts, travelled to the United Kingdom, where he successfully lobbied for support for the independence movement. Also in the ensuing referendum concerning monarchy versus republic in Norway, the popular hero Nansen's support of monarchy and his active participation in the pro-monarchy campaign is said to have had an important effect on popular opinion. After the dissolution of the union, the leading person in the creation of the new state's Ministry of Foreign Affairs was Thor von Ditten, a Norwegian of foreign nobility.

Present state 

Today, the nobility is a relatively marginal factor in the society, culturally and socially as well as in politics. Members of noble families are only individually prominent, like Anniken Huitfeldt. However, a handful of families, especially Løvenskiold, Treschow, and Wedel-Jarlsberg, still possess considerable wealth. This includes fame and regular appearance in newspapers and also coloured magazines.

Landowner and businessman Carl Otto Løvenskiold owns Maxbo among other companies. The brothers Nicolai and Peder Løvenskiold own a large number of higher private schools in Norway, among others the Westerdals School of Communication, the Bjørknes College, and the Norwegian School of Information Technology. Prominent was also the now late  landowner and businesswoman Mille-Marie Treschow, who was one of the wealthiest women in Norway.

Until and during the 20th century, noble persons have served at the Royal Court in Oslo. Prominent are (since 1985) Mistress of the Robes Ingegjerd Løvenskiold Stuart and (between 1931 and 1945) Lord Chamberlain Peder Anker Wedel-Jarlsberg.

Although privileges were abolished and official recognition of titles was removed, some families still consider themselves noble by tradition and—lawfully—still bear their inherited name and coat of arms. Claims to nobility have no effect or support in law. There are still Norwegians who enjoy official recognition from the Danish government;—the nobility in Denmark still exists. They are likewise included in the Yearbook of the Danish Nobility, published by the Association of the Danish Nobility.

The family Roos af Hjelmsäter of the Swedish nobility is among the disappearingly few of Norway's medieval noble families still living today.

Noble influence and legacy

The aristocracy has ruled and shaped Norway during nearly the whole existence of the Kingdom. Products of and references to the aristocracy are both visible and less explicit in today's society.

Major cases
In 1814 noblemen were leading when a constitutional monarchy and a parliament were established in Norway. Among them were the Count of Wedel-Jarlsberg, Peder Anker, and Christian Magnus Falsen. The Constitution of the Kingdom of Norway of 1814, which is still in function, was written by a nobleman, namely by Falsen. This constitution grants, among other things, freedom of speech, protection of private property, and prohibition of painful search and seizure.

In 1905 members of the aristocracy were leading in the independence movement. Eystein Eggen has claimed Norway's independence was realised by a 'genuinely aristocratic wave', in which especially Fridtjof Wedel-Jarlsberg Nansen and Fritz Wedel-Jarlsberg were important persons.

References
In culture
 Christian Magnus Falsen was depicted on the 1,000 kroner bank-note between 1979 and 2001.
 Peter Wessel Tordenskiold was together with non-noble Wilhelm Frimann Koren Christie depicted on the 1,000 kroner bank-note, the 100 kroner bank-note, and the 10 kroner bank-note between 1901 and 1945.
 The idiom Tordenskiold's soldiers is related to aforementioned Tordenskiold.
 Lady Inger of Ostrat is a famous romantic nationalist play published by Henrik Ibsen in 1857. It refers to Lady Ingerd Ottesdotter Rømer to Austrått. Based on the play a movie was made in 1975 by Sverre Udnæs.
 Some official coats of arms display or are inspired by noble coats of arms, among others those of the municipalities Sarpsborg (see Alv Erlingsson) and Våler (see Bolt) and of the county Troms (see Bjarkøy dynasty). The coat of arms of Lillehammer displays a Birchleg. KNM Tordenskjold, the Royal Norwegian Navy's school for maritime warfare, uses aforementioned Tordenskiold's arms.
 The Werenskiold family have produced two prominent artists, namely Erik Werenskiold (1855–1938), who especially is known for his illustrations of Norse sagas, and his son Dagfin Werenskiold (1892–1977), a sculptor and a painter.

In names and places
 Several streets, squares and so on are named after noblemen, among others Grev Wedels plass (Count Wedel Square), Løvenskiolds gate (Løvenskiold Street), Majorstua (a part of Oslo), and Wedel Jarlsberg Land.
 Several buildings, enterprises and so on are named after noblemen, among others Best Western Gyldenløve Hotell (a hotel), Marie Treschow (a private home for old people), and Georg Morgenstiernes Hus (a building at the University of Oslo campus).

Philanthropy
Norwegian foundations origined along with settled estates (stamhus) and fee tails (fideikommiss) during absolutism in Norway, and noblemen were among the first to establish such. In 1814, when the Constitution of the Kingdom of Norway was introduced, the foundation system was the only to survive; the creation of new settled estates and new fee tails was prohibited.

Of over 7,000 foundations in Norway today, several have been established by or bear the name of noble persons and families. An example is the Comital Foundation of Hielmstierne-Rosencrone, providing financial support to certain poor women in Bergen. Others are:

Det Ankerske Broderbørns og Descendenters Midler (Anker family)
 Stiftelsen Det Ankerske Waisenhus (Anker family)
 Eva og Erik Ankers Legat (Anker family)
 Johan Ankers Fond (Anker family)
 Stiftelsen De Ankerske Samlinger (Anker family)
 Assessor L.W. Knagenhjelm og Fru Selma f. Rolls Legat (Knagenhjelm family)
 Otto Løvenskiolds Legat (Løvenskiold family)
 Statsminister Carl Løvenskiold og Frues Legat (Løvenskiold family)
 Legatet til Otto Løvenskiolds Minde (Løvenskiold family)
 Professor Morgenstiernes Fond (Munthe af Morgenstierne family, B.H. von M. af M.)
 Den Grevelige Hielmstierne Rosencroneske Stiftelse (Count and Countess of Rosencrone)
 Den Grevelige Hjelmstjerne-Rosencroneske Stiftelse ved Universitetet i Oslo (Count and Countess of Rosencrone)
 Den Grevelige Hjelmstjerne-Rosencroneske Stiftelse til Universitetsbiblioteket i Oslo (Count and Countess of Rosencrone)
 Den Grevelige Hielmstierne Rosencroneske Stiftelses Legat v/Det Kgl. Norske Videnskabers Selskabs Stiftelse (Count and Countess of Rosencrone)
 Stiftelsen Skoleskibet Tordenskiold (P.W. Tordenskiold)
 Trampes Legat (Countess of Trampe)
 Fritz Gerhard Treschows Minnefond (Treschow family)
 Willum Frederik Treschows Handelhøyskolefond (Treschow family)
 Wedel-Jarlsbergsfond (Counts of Jarlsberg)
 Familien Wedel Jarlsbergs Stiftelse til Fordel for Jarlsberg Hovedgårds Pensjonister (Counts of Jarlsberg)
 Frk Harriet Wedel-Jarlsbergs Pensjonsfond for Bærums Verk (Counts of Jarlsberg)
 Gustav og Maria Smith og Hermann Wedel-Jarlsbergs Legat (Counts of Jarlsberg)
 Jarlsberg Hovedgårds Gravstedlegat (Counts of Jarlsberg)

Wollstonecraft
In her work Letters Written in Sweden, Norway, and Denmark, published in 1796, Mary Wollstonecraft shares her impressions of Norway. Some descriptions are related to the nobility and to the social structure:

 'Though the king of Denmark be an absolute monarch, yet the Norwegians appear to enjoy all the blessings of freedom.  Norway may be termed a sister kingdom; but the people have no viceroy to lord it over them, [...]' Letter VII.
 '[...] the Norwegians appear to me to be the most free community I have ever observed.' Letter VII.
 'There are only two counts in the whole country who have estates, and exact some feudal observances from their tenantry.' Letter VII.
 'In short, I have seldom heard of any noblemen so innoxious.' Letter IX.
 '[In Christiania, i.e. Oslo,] I saw the cloven foot of despotism.  I boasted to you that they had no viceroy in Norway, but these Grand Bailiffs, particularly the superior one, who resides at Christiania, are political monsters of the same species. [...] The Grand Bailiffs are mostly noblemen from Copenhagen, [...]' Letter XIII.
 'The aristocracy in Norway, if we keep clear of Christiania, is far from being formidable; and it will require a long the to enable the merchants to attain a sufficient moneyed interest to induce them to reinforce the upper class at the expense of the yeomanry, with whom they are usually connected.' Letter XIV.

Noble families

Ancient aristocratic families 
The following list contains families who appeared before, during, and after the so-called unification of Norway (c. 872–1050). To these belonged also the post-unification lendman aristocracy (1050–1184/1240).

Dukes

Earldomes

Medieval feudal counts

Earls (Jarl)

Barons

Knights (Ridder)

Squire (Væpner)

Modern aristocratic families 
Years of denoblement (extinction) refer to when the last noble male member died. It should, however, be noted that several letters patent treated men and women equally; when unmarried or widowed, such women had a personal and independent status as noble. An example is the letters patent of the Løvenskiold family, which uses the term 'legitimate issue of the male and the female sexus'.

Marquises

Feudal counts

Feudal barons

Titular counts, titular barons, and nobility

Noble titles 

Several different sets of titles have existed, and also the function and the content of titles have varied. There are considerable differences between medieval titles and modern ones.

Dano-Norwegian titles are different from the British concept of peerage. Whilst a peerage is inherited upon the holder's death and normally by the eldest son only, a Dano-Norwegian title was normally received by all legitimate sons and daughters at the moment of their birth, meaning that there could be several countesses or barons of the same family at the same time. The exception was the title of count (greve for men and grevinne for women), which in general was restricted to the bearer, his wife, and his eldest son.

One has to distinguish between titles and fiefs. For example, the (administrative) fief Countship of Jarlsberg was dissolved in 1821, but the recognition of the title Count of Jarlsberg was not abolished until 1893, and the (physical) estate of Jarlsberg is still in the family's possession.

Whilst a fief in Norway was limited to Norway, the title was also Danish. Likewise a fief-based title in Denmark was also Norwegian. In other words, titles were dual. For example, there were/are a Norwegian fief Countship of Jarlsberg, a Norwegian title Count of Jarlsberg (no longer officially recognised), and a Danish title Count of Jarlsberg (still officially recognised).

The 1821 Nobility Law initiated a long-range abolition of official recognition of noble titles (not of titles per se).

Ancient aristocratic titles 

Note: This list may not express accurate rank between the titles.

Medieval aristocratic titles (1st system) 

Duke
In 1237 Earl Skule Bårdsson was given the title and the rank of duke. It was the first time this title had been used in Norway, and it involved that the title of earl no longer had the highest rank below the King. It also heralded the introduction of new noble titles from Continental Europe, which were to replace the old Norse titles.

Earl
In the process of increasing his power and territory by annexing petty kingdoms, Norway's high king offered vassalage titles in return for recognition and military support from each petty king and his aristocracy. Such regional kings and chieftains received the title of earl. Earls were the only ones beside the King himself who were entitled to hold an army.

Later, during the Middle Ages, Earl was in general a title restricted to members of the royal family. There was usually no more than one earl in mainland Norway at one time, and sometimes none. The last earl in mainland Norway was appointed in 1295.

In mainland Norway, this title was used normally for one of two purposes:

 To appoint a de facto ruler in cases where the King was a minor or seriously ill, e.g. Haakon the Crazy in 1204 during the minority of King Guttorm, Skule Bårdsson in 1217 during the illness of King Inge Bårdsson.
 To appease a pretender to the throne without giving him the title of king, e.g. Eirik, the brother of King Sverre.

Baron (medieval)
Lendmann was the highest rank attainable in the hird, and a lendmann stood beneath only earls and the King.

King Magnus VI abolished the title lendmann in 1277, and lendmen were given the title of baron In 1308, King Haakon V abolished this title, and a new set of titles was subsequently introduced: ridder (knight) and væpner (squire).

Medieval aristocratic titles (2nd system) 

Knight and squire
The titles of knight and squire were introduced in 1308.

Modern aristocratic titles 
Introduced in 1671 with the titles of baron and count, and supplied with the title of marquis in 1709, the following system is the current in Norway.

The class of barons and the class of counts were even internally divided. A count would be a titular count (greve), a feudal count (lensgreve) or a national count (riksgreve). Likewise a baron would be a titular baron (friherre), a feudal baron (lensfriherre) or a national baron (riksfriherre). For example, a lensgreve uses the title greve only.

The correct combination of names and title when using Norwegian is first name + title + last name, e.g. Peder Anker grev Wedel Jarlsberg. The titles greve and friherre are abbreviated to respectively grev and friherr when used in names or addressing the person concerned, e.g. Peder Anker grev Wedel Jarlsberg or friherr Holberg. However, it is written Peder Anker Wedel Jarlsberg, greve til Jarlsberg when the complete title is added to the complete name separated by a comma.

Traditionally, ennobled men have kept their birth name along with their name of nobility. Titles come in addition to these.

Examples:

 Johann Friedrich Struensee (old name) → Johan Friedrich Struensee, Count to Struensee (old name, new title)
 Joachim Geelmuyden (old name) → Joachim Geelmuyden Gyldenkrantz (old name, new name).
 Vilhelm Marselis (old name) → Vilhelm Marselis Güldencrone, Baron to Wilhelmsborg (old name, new name, new title)

However, the old name is usually not kept when the name of nobility derives from this.

Examples:

 Hans Blix → Hans Blixencrone (not: Hans Blix Blixencrone)
 Bernt Ancher → Bernt Anker (not: Bernt Ancher Anker)

Whilst an ennobled man kept his old family name together with his name of nobility, descendants inherited the name of nobility only. However, descendants who receive the same given name as him usually receive his old family name too.

Example:

 Herman Leopoldus, ennobled as Herman Leopoldus Løvenskiold, has descendants named Herman Leopoldus Løvenskiold.

Marquis
In 1709 King Frederick IV of Norway granted the title Marquis of Lista, then spelled Lister, to Hugo Octavius Accoramboni of Florence in Italy. Apparently the Marquis of Lista died without issue.

In 1710 the same king granted the title Marquis of Mandal to Francisco di Ratta and to the latter's nephews Giuseppe di Ratta and Luigi di Ratta of Bologna in Italy. In Norway official recognition of this title was abolished under the 1821 Nobility Law. In Denmark it seems to have lasted until 1890.

Norway remains the only country in Scandinavia to which the title of marquis is attached.

Count
The title of count was introduced in 1671.

In some families having the title of count, among others Wedel-Jarlsberg, younger sons bear the dependent title of baron. This is often specified in each family's letters patent.

Baron (modern)
The modern title of baron was introduced in 1671.

Noble institutions

The old nobility had several arenas on which they gathered. Beside the Council of the Kingdom, which was abolished in 1536, the nobility met at (1) homages to new kings (Norwegian: kongehylling), (2) meetings of the nobility (adelsmøte), (3) meetings of the estates (stendermøte), and (4) days of the lords (herredag). The nobility's function after 1536 was mainly administrative and ceremonial.

List of Noble Meetings
 Meeting of the Nobility of 1582
 Meeting of the Nobility of 1646

List of Meetings of the Estates
 Meeting of the Estates of 1639

List of Homages
 Homage of 1548
 Homage of 1591
 Homage of 1610
 Homage of 1648
 Hereditary Homage of 1661

List of Days of the Lords
 Days of the Lords of 1646
 Days of the Lords of 1652

Homage of 1591
The homage of 1591 at Akershus Fortress provides information about the Norwegian nobility in the late 16th century. The Norwegian noblemen who were represented at the homage consisted of some Danes—names like Gyldenstierne, Lange, Juel, and Huitfeldt—, some Norwegians—names like Benkestok—, a couple of foreigners—Mowat (Scottish) and Norman de la Navité (French)—, and approximately 30 Norwegians with patronyms (names ending on -sen).

Request of 1648
In 1648, the nobility requested in a letter to the King that ‘[...] we and our descendants must be held by the Christian right faith and the Augsburg Confession, so [that] it here in the Kingdom shall be maintained, protected, and shielded’ and that ‘we and our descendants of the noble estate here in Norway must be held by Norway’s law and right, [...] and enjoy the same privileges [...] as the nobility in Denmark [has received]’. Himself being Evangelical Lutheran, the King confirmed that ‘[...] the true and pure religion remains unfalsified in lands and kingdoms [...]’.

Noble privileges
The noble privileges consisted of freedoms (Norwegian: frihet), rights (Norwegian: rettighet), and prerogatives (Norwegian: forrettighet). There were two primary sources for such privileges: the letters of privilege and the electoral charters, both issued by the King.

The royal decrees on the order of precedence, introduced in the 17th century, created the office nobility (Norwegian: embetsadel, rangadel), i.e. persons who by holding a high civilian or military office or by belonging to, most often, one of the three highest classes of rank automatically received noble status for themselves as well as for wife and legitimate children.

To be "granted" nobility and have those few privileges wealthy people only had to pay an amount of money to the Danish union king's private account ("partikulærkassen").

List of Electoral Charters
 Electoral Charter of 1449 (Only Norway.)
 Electoral Charter of 1483 (Both Norway and Denmark.)
 Electoral Charter of 1513 (Both Norway and Denmark.)
 Electoral Charter of 1524 (Only Norway.)
 Electoral Charter of 1536 (Only Denmark.)
 Electoral Charter of 1648 (Only Denmark.)

List of Noble Privileges
 Noble Privileges of 1582
 Noble Privileges of 1591
 Noble Privileges of 1646
 Noble Privileges of 1649
 Noble Privileges of 1661
 Counts' Privileges of 1671 (25 May)
 Barons' Privileges of 1671 (25 May)

List of Decrees on Order of Precedence
 Decree on the Order of Precedence of 1671
 Decree on the Order of Precedence of 1680
 Decree on the Order of Precedence of 1693
 Decree on the Order of Precedence of 1717
 Decree on the Order of Precedence of 1730
 Decree on the Order of Precedence of 1743
 Decree on the Order of Precedence of 1746
 Decree on the Order of Precedence of 1808

The decree of 1808 was the last of its kind to be in introduced in Norway. The personal union between Denmark and Norway was dissolved in 1814. In Denmark the decree of 1746, with some changes and amendments, still exists.

Noble privileges of 1582
The noble privileges of 1582, given before the Meeting of the Nobility in the same year, decreed that a noblewoman who married a non-noble man should lose all her hereditary land to her nearest co-inheritor. The rule was designed with the intention of keeping noble land in noble hand and thus strengthening the nobility's power base. A similar clause in 1591 stated that a nobleman who married a non-noble woman should forfeit noble status for their children.

Noble privileges of 1661
The noble privileges of 1661 (1) reconfirmed the neck and hand, (4) reconfirmed the right for the nobility on their estates and in thereto belonging woods and waters to hunt and fish, (5) stated jura patronatus, but together with a duty to maintain the church buildings and such, (7, 8) stated that the nobility shall enjoy rank and honour above all others, (10) stated that the nobility when on travels representing the King shall receive a certain monetary compensation, (13) stated that no nobleman may be sentenced from honour or life by others than the King and his highest court, (14) stated that no nobleman may be arrested, and (22) reconfirmed the birk right.

Tax freedom
Noblemen enjoyed personal tax freedom, although this was later abolished. Tax freedom for their seat farms remained.

Noblemen had other economic privileges, among others freedom from duty on imported and exported goods, such as beer and wine.

Seat farm

Seat farms (Norwegian: setegård, setegard) were until 1660 an exclusive privilege of the nobility. A seat farm, a form of feudal demesne, was a nobleman's main residence; the place where he had his seat. Seat farms had, especially, freedom from tax and tithes.

While previously any farm on which a nobleman decided to reside would thereby acquire the status of seat farm, the right to become a seat farm was remarkably limited in 1639, when the law was changed to require a farm to have been a seat farm for a minimum of 40 years in order for it to be officially recognised. After 1800, the tax freedom was modified, and under the 1821 Nobility Law, the tax freedom was ended at the then current owner's death.

Weekday farmers
Weekday farmers (Norwegian: ukedagsbønder, vekedagsbønder) were persons who, as tenants of the noble, had a duty to work on the seat farm on weekdays. The system came from Denmark before 1600. It became most widespread in Eastern Norway, where the concentration of seat farms was highest, but existed also in other parts of the Kingdom. From 1685 on, the duty work was limited to farmers who lived within two miles of the seat farm.

Feud right
The feud right (Norwegian: feiderett) was the right to officially proclaim a feud between two or more persons. A murder committed after the proclamation of a feud was considered an ‘honest murder’, and unlike ordinary murders, which normally received capital punishment, could be expiated with fines. The feud right is mentioned in almost all electoral charters from 1513 to 1648.

Conveyance right
The King and noblemen, as well as high officials, had the right to receive conveyance from farmers. The right was never a formal right, but rather a consequence of the ‘conveyance duty’ which was imposed on farmers. Conveyance duty (Norwegian: skyssplikt) is known since the 12th century and functioned as indirect taxation. In 1816, the duty was changed from being a free service to receiving payment per trip. However, the partial tax freedom which conveyance farmers had was abolished at the same time.

Neck and hand right
In 1646, the nobility achieved the possibility of having ‘neck and hand right’ (Norwegian: hals- og håndsrett), that is, the authority to arrest and to prosecute persons and to execute judgments. This right was limited to farms or fiefs over which noblemen had jurisdiction.

Charge and fine right
Related to the neck and hand right was the ‘charge and fine right’ (Norwegian: sikt- og sakefallsrett), that is, the authority to raise a charge against and to fine persons. This right, too, was limited to each nobleman's area of jurisdiction.

Birk right
The birk right (Norwegian: birkerett) was the authority to appoint judges at the birk court, etcetera; birks were an ancient form of local jurisdiction adopted in Norway on the Danish model. Nine birks were created in 1649, but abolished already in 1651. The first real birks came in 1671 with the creation of the Countship of Larvik, in 1673 with the creation of the Countship of Griffenfeld, and in 1678 with the creation of the Barony of Rosendal. In addition the birk right was granted to the Halsnøy Monastery in 1661, the Lysekloster Estate in 1661, and the Svanøy Estate in 1685. The two countship birks and the barony birk lasted until 1821, when they were ‘entirely abolished’.

Jus patronatus
The jus patronatus (patronage right) consisted of jus presentandi, the right to propose clergy for a specific church, and later became jus vocandi, the right to appoint such clergy. Furthermore, the patron had the right to part of the church taxes and other income of the church. Jus patronatus did not have any relevance in Norway until after the 1640s, when a few noblemen began to receive it. This privilege was never widespread in the Kingdom.

Various
Around 1277, lendmen and skutilsveins received tax freedom for themselves and two members of their household, and ordinary members of the hird received the same, but for one member of their household.

In 1548, the nobility's attempts to weaken farmers’ allodial land right (Norwegian: odelsrett) were rejected by the King and the Danish Council of the Kingdom.

Noble symbolism

Coat of arms 

The use of coats of arms was originally a custom developed and maintained by the nobility, but it was not exclusive to this estate. Norwegian farmers and burghers, as well as the non-noble parts of the clergy, had since early times borne arms in addition to more commonly used house marks.

While the arms of the old nobility were of ancient origin and inherited through generations within each family, and therefore were not a (known) privilege from the King, the arms of the new nobility were often granted by the King upon ennoblement. In some cases, the ennobled person's former coat of arms or his wishes could be regarded in the process of composing new arms and achievements.

Helm
According to Dano-Norwegian custom, both nobles and non-nobles could use an open helm above the shield. (In Sweden, open helms were a privilege exclusive for the nobility.) Nobles used one, barons used two, and counts used three helms. Alternatively, counts’ helms had eleven bars and barons’ helms had seven bars.

Coronet
Noble coronets (Norwegian: adelskrone) or coronets of rank (rangkrone), whether physical coronets or appearing in heraldic artwork, were reserved for the nobility. There were specific coronets for counts, barons, and nobility. In addition, the Golden Lions—illegitimate royal descendants—had an exclusive coronet.

Supporters
Supporters were normally given only to counts.

Motto
Some noble families have mottos. These are always in Latin.

Examples:

 Counts of Wedel-Jarlsberg: RECTE FACIENDO NEMINEM TIMEAS
 Barons of Rosendal: MELIUS MORI IN LIBERTATE QUAM VIVERE IN SERVITUTE
 Anker: GLORIA EX UTILE
 Treschow: PIE CANDIDE CONSTANTER

Names

Almost unique internationally and different from the continental nobility, where families have named themselves after the piece of land that they possess, Nordic nobles have since the 16th century in general adopted family names of an abstract and artistical character, often based on their respective coats of arms. For example, the noble family whose arms were a golden star, took the name Gyldenstierne. As this custom of the old nobility established itself as permanent, also the new nobility, that is persons and families ennobled after the Medieval Ages, often received similar names when ennobled.

Other examples are Anker, Gyllenpistol (Golden Gun) in Sweden, Hästesko (Horseshoe) in Sweden, Huitfeldt (White Field), Løvenørn (Lion Eagle), Natt och Dag (Night and Day) in Sweden, Rosenvinge (Rose Wing), Svanenhielm (Swan Helm), Svinhufvud (Swine Head) in Sweden, and Tordenskiold (Thunder Shield).

Particle
The use of particles like af, von, and de—all these mean of—was no particular privilege for the nobility, but on the other hand almost exclusively used by and associated with them. Especially in the late 17th century and the 18th century, one would often receive a particle together with one's old or new name when ennobled. Examples are families like de Gyldenpalm (lit. ‘of Goldenpalm’) and, with two particles, von Munthe af Morgenstierne (lit. ‘of Munthe of Morningstar’).

Prominent non-noble families having used particles are von Cappelen, von der Lippe, and de Créqui dit la Roche.

Preposition
A nobleman had the right to write himself to  the seat farm(s) or the estate(s) on which he resided, for example ‘Sigurd Jonsson til Sudreim’. This preposition must not be confused with particles, which were a part of names.

Consumption 

Clothing
Already in the Medieval Ages a man was not allowed to dress in clothes implying that he belonged to another estate than his actual.

Whilst commoners could not wear finer clothes than nobles did, the nobility had to make sure they were not better dressed than the King and his family. In 1528 a royal decree decided that no noble could own more than three clothes of silk. No ladies or maids could wear broad bonnets. Pearls in textiles as well as textiles containing gold were reserved for royal persons.

Usually a cloth's value was relatively big. Accessories were no exception. For example, a pearl bonnet alone could cost as much as 100 dollars; this was three years' salary for a carpenter. Expensive were also gold chains, bonnets with ostrich feathers, etcetera. As such clothes were not only a matter of dressing, but also a part a family's capital.

Slitted clothes were usual among (female) nobles. This would reveal that a garment had two layers of textile.

Education
Many noblemen received their education at the Sorø Academy in Denmark, a knight academy. Young men of the high nobility studied also at German universities.

16th and 17th century
During their trade with foreigners the nobility acquired luxurious products, for example chocolates, saffron, cinnamon, nutmeg, olive, and citrus. They desired and received new technology, such as stoves and bracket clocks. Also living animals were popular.

It was customary to give each other presents, for example horses, precious metals, and exotic fruits, especially to more important nobles or if one wished a service in return.

A case of exceptional dimensions was when William IV, Landgrave of Hesse-Kassel asked whether Tycho Brahe in Denmark was able to get him some reindeers. Brahe wrote to his relative Axel Gyldenstierne, Governor-general of Norway, and after some struggle Gyldenstierne was able to find five animals, of which two were sent by ship to Brahe.

Relation to the people

Cognatic descent of medieval aristocracy 

A large number of Norwegians may trace ancestral lines back to members of various levels of medieval aristocracy. They must very often cross numerous cognatic links and go back to the 16th century in order to establish a connection to the nobility. (An important consideration in this regard is that many experts dispute some popularly accepted family relations, which they consider undocumented or obviously wrong.) Queen Sonja of Norway, born a commoner, has noblemen among her distant forefathers.

Whilst nearly all families of medieval aristocracy have become patrilineally extinct, there are families today whose patrilineal ancestors were close cognatic descendants of old noble families, for example some Nordland families, the most prominent being the Ellingsen family, whose progenitor shipper and tradesman Elling Christophersen was a great-grandson of Margrethe Jonsdotter Benkestok, and the Christensen family of the Husby Estate, whose progenitor shipper and tradesman Anders Christensen was a great-great-grandson of aforementioned Margrethe.

Even though a family could lose their noble status, they would usually keep their land and fortune. There are examples of non-noble descendants who have inherited previously noble land centuries after the noble family concerned had become patrilineally extinct. One example is the estate of the Benkestok family, who lost their noble status in the late 16th century and disappeared patrilineally after 1672. The estate originally consisted of land in Eastern, Western, and Northern Norway as well as on the Faroe Islands and Shetland. Whilst the first generations of inheritors received large portions of land, it would subsequently be divided into smaller and smaller parts so that inheritors of later generations each received, be it, a large farm.

Concerning descent from royalty through nobility, nobility expert Tore Vigerust has stated, though as a conservative estimate, that roughly 10,000 Norwegians living today can document with certainty their descent from the old kings of Norway and European royal houses. Vigerust has identified the late medieval noble families Gyldenløve of Austrått and Rosensverd as families whose royal descent is verifiable.

Examples:

 Carl Martin Ellingsen (1848–1926), of the aforementioned Nordland family Ellingsen, was a Member of Parliament.

Cognatic descent of modern aristocracy 

A considerably smaller number of Norwegians descend from families of modern aristocracy, patrilineally as well as through cognatic links. Among such descendants, one finds several nationally and even internationally prominent persons.

Examples:

 Fridtjof Wedel-Jarlsberg Nansen (1861–1930), whose mother was Baroness Adelaide of Wedel-Jarlsberg, was an explorer.
 Bokken Lasson (1871–1970), whose mother was a Munthe af Morgenstierne, was a cabaret singer and as well a member of the Kristiania Bohemians.
 Pontine Paus (born 1973), a granddaughter of Countess Hedevig of Wedel-Jarlsberg, is a world-leading designer of handbags.

Miscellaneous
Through many ages, common people have desired either to be noble or to descend from members of this estate. This has led some to construct fraudulent ahnentafels (pedigree charts) or to accept erroneous ahnentafels.

An extreme case of such ahnentafels is that of Jon Bratt Otnes (1919–2004). Otnes was born into the lowest class of the farmer estate; his father was a cotter. In the 1970s and with a heavily erroneous ahnentafel, Otnes began to claim publicly that he was the current head of the Medieval noble family of Brat/Bratt and that he thus could have been King of Norway and of Sweden. This case caused much controversy between the 1970s and 2000.

During parts of the Romantic Nationalist epoch and the subsequent worshipping of Vikings, when it was popular and/or gave a particular high status to demonstrate descent from the 'real' (i.e. Medieval, non-foreign) noble families and kings of Norway, fraudulent pedigrees flourished. This was the case also during the illegitimate National Unification rule during Germany's occupation of Norway (1940–1945).

Nobility as a term

Medieval terms 
The medieval aristocracy called themselves hird and later ‘free men’ likewise as commoners were called ‘unfree’. Knights were gathered in a particular class known as the Knighthood, which stood above what was called ‘ordinary nobility’. The aristocracy did not adopt and use the term ‘nobility’ until the late 15th and the early 16th century; this originally German word arrived at the same time as the German Oldenburg Kings of Norway. However, the entity was completely the same before and after the introduction of this term.

Old and new nobility 
In some cases it is difficult to draw a clear border between old nobility alias the medieval aristocracy and new nobility alias the modern aristocracy. A consensual definition is that new nobility are persons and families who were ennobled by letters patent by Norwegian monarchs, primarily monarchs after and including Queen Margaret. Even though the term ‘new nobility’ is often considered as identical with ‘post-medieval nobility’, a not unconsiderable amount of so-called letter-noble families were ennobled and operated politically and militarily in the Late Medieval Age, among others the Rosenvinge family, ennobled in 1505.

Old nobility from Denmark is considered as new nobility in Norway, not least because they represented a new era—that of foreign rule—in Norway's history.

High and low nobility 
The high nobility consists of titled persons and families. The low nobility is untitled. This set of term applies mainly to nobility after 1671, when the titles of count and of baron were introduced. Families whose members have had seats in the pre-1536 Council of the Kingdom—the Riksråd—are considered as high nobility in Norway. They are even known under their own term, riksråd nobility.

Sword nobility and robe nobility 
The terms sword nobility and robe nobility refer to the nobility before and after 1660, respectively.

Office nobility and letter nobility 
These terms are treated in this article's section Modern aristocracy.

Uradel 
Uradel (English: lit. ‘primeval nobility’) is an originally German and romantic term that was coined in the 1820s and later adopted into the Norwegian language as well as into Danish and Swedish. The term refers to the medieval aristocracy. The opposite of uradel is brevadel (English: lit. ‘letter nobility’).

Other terms of nobility

Authentic farmer nobility
Farmer nobility (Norwegian: bondeadel) refers to farmers who were noble.

This term may also be used unofficially to describe farmers who had been noble or who had such ancestry through cognatic links and within a short genealogical timeframe. They were not a part of the Norwegian nobility.

For example, in 1768, when asked by the authorities in Copenhagen whether there still lived old nobility in the districts Senja and Troms in Northern Norway, a Danish-rooted official wrote: ‘Of old nobility I know nothing here in the north, but here is far too much farmer nobility or Benkestok nobility!’ As an immigrant to the region, he was unfamiliar with the strong feeling of pride among the so-called page nobility (see below) and the farmers of aristocratic origin.

Romantic nationalistic farmer nobility
After Norway achieved constitutional independence in 1814, in the period of romantic nationalism that followed, the urban ‘cultural élite’ as well as some farmers themselves began to consider the ‘Norwegian farmer’ as representative or a symbolic figure of ‘Norwegianness’. Norwegian farmers had always been relatively free compared to farmers in continental Europe, something to which the lack of a large and strong nobility had contributed. Farmers had in general sufficient amounts of food, and lived ‘in peaceful and natural circumstances’. Furthermore, from the middle of the 18th century, and peaking in the 19th, many Norwegian farmers managed to buy their own farms. Factors like these contributed to some farmers coming to regard themselves as a kind of farmer nobility. Such ideas are reflected, for example, in romantic nationalistic literature, but the term has never had any legal currency in Norway, and such farmers were and remained commoners.

For example, the teacher Andreas Austlid wrote in his book Salt fraa folkehøgskulen (1926) about his home parish: ‘An old parish of wealth, broad and satisfied and good – the most beautiful in the whole valley. A kind and calm farmer nobility - but self-supplied [with food], with much good and much low ancestry ...’

Page nobility

Page nobility (knape means page or boy) was and is a non-legal term referring to historical and in many cases biological descendants of the clerical setesveins in Northern Norway. As traders and shippers, these descendants in the late 16th and the 17th centuries constituted the leading non-noble class in the region. In the 18th century, however, the term knape was in general used for all non-privileged traders and shippers regardless of their backgrounds.

Expressions and extrapolated usage
In modern Norwegian language, there are several expressions containing noble terms and titles. Examples are:

 adel, adelig: arbeidets adel, nobility of labour
 fyrste, fyrstelig: fyrstelig mottakelse, be received in a splendid manner, more seg fyrstelig, rejoice like a prince
 greve, grevelig: (ankomme) i grevens tid, (arrive) just in time and/or as the last person, leve som en greve, live like a count, i.e. luxuriously

Furthermore, noble titles are used to describe persons who within respective sections of society have a leading position. Examples are:

 -adel: lønnsadel, lit. wage nobility, nikkersadel, lit. knickerbockers nobility (Oslo only)
 -baron: matbaron, food (chain) baron, oljebaron, oil baron, hotellbaron, hotel baron, "narkobaron" drug lord
 -fyrste: finansfyrste, prince of finances, åndsfyrste, intellectual prince, tåkefyrste, lit. fog prince
 -aristokrati: pengearistokrati, moneyed aristocracy, åndsaristokrati, intellectual aristocracy

See also

 Foreign nobility in Norway
 Norwegian patriciate

References

Literature
 Aschehougs Norgeshistorie 1 → See: Lillehammer (1994)
 Aschehougs Norgeshistorie 2 → See: Krag (1995)
 Aschehougs Norgeshistorie 3 → See: Helle (1995)
 Helle, Knut (1995): Aschehougs Norgeshistorie 3 (Under kirke og kongemakt 1130–1350)
 Johansen, Øystein Kock (2000): Bronse og makt
 Lillehammer, Arnvid (1994): Aschehougs Norgeshistorie 1 (Fra jeger til bonde –inntil 800 e.Kr.)
 Krag, Claus (1995): Aschehougs Norgeshistorie 2 (Vikingtid og rikssamling 800–1130)

External links
 Eggen, Eystein: Aristokratenes 1905 (Norwegian; The Aristocrats’ 1905.)
 Løberg, Lars: Norsk adel – hadde vi det? (Norwegian; Norwegian Nobility – Did We Have One?)
 Vigerust, Tore: Adelsprosjektet (Norwegian.)

Norwegian nobility
Society of Norway
Danish nobility
Icelandic nobility

da:Norske adelsslægter
de:Norwegischer Adel